Bjärsjöholm Castle or Bjersjöholm Castle ( or Bjersjöholm slott) is a manor dating from the 16th century, northwest of Ystad in Scania, Sweden. Originally consisting of four brick buildings built around a courtyard, the present manor consists of two buildings.

To the north is the original Renaissance style manor from 1576, built by Björn Kaas. It was abandoned due to settlements. 
A new manor was designed by Ferdinand Meldahl (1827–1908) was built in 1850. The newer addition on the estate was built in Romantic, German style in 1849–50, on a hill just south of the old manor. It is a three-story building flanked by two square towers. In 1890, one of the Renaissance buildings needed extensive renovations and only the gables could be saved.

See also
Bjäresjö Runestones

References

External links
 Bjersjöholm 

Castles in Skåne County